Kyle Aditya Kumaran is a racing driver of Indian Origin from the state of Tamil Nadu based in Dubai, UAE. He is the Vice World Champion (DD2 Category) in Rotax Grand Final at Bahrain held on 18 Dec 2021. He is currently the only Indian to have won a trophy at a world karting event. He won the Senior Max title in the Meco FMSCI National Karting Chamship Rotax Max class 2021 at the Meco Kartopia Track in November. Kumaran also won the Middle East and North Africa (MENA) Nations Cup in DD2 class.

Career

Karting International Races

UAE Championships
 Champion – Junior, Sodi World Series (SWS) 2017
 Champion – MAX (Senior), RMC 2017-18 
 Champion ( x2 ) 
 DD2, RMC 2019-20 & 2021-22
 Champion ( x2 ) – Senior, SWS 2020 & 2021 
 Champion ( x2 ) – Endurance, SWS 2020 & 2021 
 Champion – Senior, IAME Summer Series 2021
 Champion – DD2, Dubai O Plate 2022
 Vice Champion – Junior, IAME X30 2017-18 
 Vice Champion – DD2 RMC 2018-19
 3rd – Senior, IAME X30 2018-19 
 3rd – Senior, IAME X30 2021-22
 3rd – Senior, IAME X30 Middle East Cup 2021
 4th – Senior, IAME X30 2019-20
 5th - 2018 (Junior) & 2019 (Senior), Dubai O Plate

Racing record

Career summary

References

Living people
Indian racing drivers
Indian expatriate sportspeople in the United Arab Emirates
Year of birth missing (living people)
FIA Motorsport Games drivers
MRF Challenge Formula 2000 Championship drivers
UAE F4 Championship drivers
Mumbai Falcons drivers